A United States Aviator Badge refers to three types of aviation badges issued by the United States Armed Forces, those being for Air Force, Army, and Naval (to include Marine and Coast Guard) aviation.

Air Force and Army Aviator Badges are issued in three ratings: Basic, Senior, and Command (Air Force)/Master (Army). The higher degrees are denoted by a star or star with wreath above the badge. Air Force regulations state that the basic rating denotes completion of specified training and that the advanced ratings denote experience levels. The Naval Aviator Badge is issued in a single rating for Navy, Marine Corps, and Coast Guard aviators.

United States Air Force

World War I
The first United States Aviator Badges were issued to members of the Air Service during World War I. The badges were issued in three degrees: Observer (a "US" shield and one left-side wing), Junior Aviator or Reserve Aviation Officer (a "US" shield between two wings), and Senior Aviator (a star over "US" shield between two wings). The Army Air Service also issued a badge for balloon pilots, known as the Aeronaut Badge.

Enlisted Aviators wore their regular rank insignia and the Observer's badge. There were 29 enlisted pilots before the American entry into World War I. The second enlisted aviator, William A. Lamkey, got a discharge and flew for Pancho Villa. The remaining enlisted pilots received commissions in 1917. There were 60 enlisted mechanics who were trained as pilots in France during the war, but they were used for ferrying duties and did not fly in combat. The recruiting and training of enlisted Aviators ended in 1933.

World War II

During World War II, with the rise of the Army Air Forces, a second series of aviator badges were issued to include a design that has survived to the modern day. The Pilot Badge was issued in three degrees, including Pilot, Senior Pilot, and Command Pilot. A polished silver colored version of these badges is currently used as the United States Air Force Pilot Badges.

From August 1941 to November 1942, the Enlisted Aviator program was restarted. Candidates had to be at least 18, possess a high school diploma, and have graduated at the top of their high school class. Graduates were rated as Flight Staff Sergeants or Flight Technical Sergeants and wore the same pilot's wings as officers. They were usually assigned to pilots of transport and auxiliary aircraft to free officer pilots to pilot the more prestigious fighters and bombers. Auxiliary pilots received their own special wings to indicate their status and specialty. In November 1942 all enlisted pilots were promoted to Flight Officer rank and enlisted cadets were graded as Flight Officers or Second Lieutenants depending on merit.  The qualifying requirements for the Senior Pilot Wings are: Seven (7) years as rated pilot and permanent award of pilot rating.  Plus 2000 total hours or 1300 hours primary and instructor flight (refer to U.S. Air Force aeronautical rating for details).

Independent Air Force
In 1947, the U.S. Army Air Forces became its own separate service as the U.S. Air Force. The Air Force use the same pilot's badges as the earlier USAAF design, except that starting in the mid-1990s, they began to be made of chrome metal or sterling silver rather than the dull alloy wings used by the Army Air Forces and Air Force from 1947 to the mid-1990s.  The U.S. Air Force currently issues several aviation badges including pilot, combat systems officer (formerly navigator), air battle manager, flight surgeon, flight nurse, non-rated officer aircrew, and enlisted aircrew.  The requirements to earn these are listed here.

United States Army

After the creation of the U.S. Air Force as a separate service in 1947, Army Aviation continued to a degree that warranted a new badge for Army Aviators (who piloted light observation and liaison airplanes and helicopters). The result was the creation of the Army Aviator Badge, which is a modified version of the U.S. Air Force Pilot Badge. It comes in three grades: Basic, Senior (7 years' service and 1,000 flight hours), and Master (15 years' service and 2,000 flight hours). The Aviator and Senior Aviator Badges were approved on 27 July 1950 and the Master Aviator Badge was approved on 12 February 1957.

United States Navy, Marine Corps and Coast Guard

The aviator badge currently used in the Navy has remained virtually unchanged since it was first issued on 13 November 1917. The Naval Aviator Badge is earned by all U.S. Navy, U.S. Marine Corps, and U.S. Coast Guard pilots upon graduation from advanced flight training.  Additional aviator badges exist for Naval Flight Officers (USN & USMC), Naval Flight Surgeons, Naval Aviation Physiologists, Naval Flight Nurses, Naval Aviation Observers (USN & USMC) and enlisted Naval Aircrewman (USN, USMC & USCG).  Naval Aviators' badges are gold in color.  Unlike the Air Force and the Army, the naval services do not employ senior or command/master aeronautical ratings.

NOAA Commissioned Officer Corps

The NOAA Commissioned Officer Corps Aviator Insignia is a gold-colored pin, winged, with a central device consisting of a fouled anchor surcharged with a NOAA Corps device.  NOAA Corps officer pilots and navigators may wear the NOAA aviator insignia after authorization by the Director of the NOAA Corps.

NASA

With the dawn of the Space Age, all of the United States Aviator badges are upgradable to the Astronaut Badge, for those military members who become astronauts.

See also
Badges of the United States Air Force
Badges of the United States Army
Badges of the United States Coast Guard
Badges of the United States Marine Corps
Badges of the United States Navy
Aircrew Badge
Flight Officer Badge
Naval Aviator Badge
Navigator Badge
Observer Badge
Astronaut Badge
Military badges of the United States
Obsolete badges of the United States military

References

United States military badges